Euryentmema australiana is a small sea snail, a marine gastropod mollusk in the family Mangeliidae.

Description

Distribution

References

External links
 Biolib.cz: Euryentmema australiana 

australiana
Gastropods described in 1983